Cledaucus  was a legendary king of the Britons as accounted by Geoffrey of Monmouth.  He was preceded by Eliud and succeeded by Clotenus.

References

Legendary British kings